Matucana blancii is a cactus in the genus Matucana of the family Cactaceae.

Synonyms
 Borzicactus aurantiacus var. megalanthus (F. Ritter) Donald
 Matucana blancii var. nigriarmata Backeb.
 Matucana crinifera F. Ritter
 Matucana herzogiana Backeb.
 Matucana megalantha F. Ritter
 Matucana winteri F. Ritter
 Matucana yanganucensis Rauh & Backeb.
 Matucana yanganucensis var. albispina Rauh & Backeb.
 Matucana yanganucensis var. fuscispina Rauh & Backeb.
 Matucana yanganucensis var. longistyla Rauh & Backeb.
 Matucana yanganucensis var. parviflora Rauh & Backeb.
 Matucana yanganucensis var. salmonea Rauh & Backeb.
 Matucana yanganucensis var. setosa F. Ritter
 Matucana yanganucensis var. suberecta Rauh & Backeb.

References

 The Plant List entry
 GBIF entry
 ITIS Report entry

Trichocereeae
Cacti of South America
Endemic flora of Peru